Gordhan Verma is an Indian politician and former Member of the Rajasthan Legislative Assembly from Dhod Sikar district in Rajasthan. He is a Bharatiya Janata Party politician. He is former state president of Bhartiya Janta Party SC Morcha. As he is former Pradhan of Dhod panchayat samiti so people often call him 'Pradhan Ji'. His profession is agriculture.

External Link 
Gordhan Verma On Twitter

References

Living people
Bharatiya Janata Party politicians from Rajasthan
Rajasthan MLAs 2013–2018
1973 births